Marine Attack Squadron 322 (VMA-322) was an attack squadron in the United States Marine Corps.  The squadron, also known as the “Fighting Gamecocks”, fought in World War II and later became a part of the Marine Forces Reserve based out of Naval Air Station South Weymouth, Massachusetts.

History

Marine Fighting Squadron 322 (VMF-322) was established on July 1, 1943, at Marine Corps Air Station Cherry Point flying the F4U Corsair.  In the fall of that year they moved to Marine Corps Recruit Depot Parris Island, South Carolina to continue their training.  They moved again in January, 1944 to Marine Corps Air Station Ewa, Hawaii.

In October, 1944, the squadron became part of Marine Aircraft Group 33 (MAG-33) when they moved to Espiritu Santo.  The squadron was part of the Battle of Okinawa and on April 3, 1945, over 150 of its members were killed when its lead support element was struck by a Kamikaze.  They rebounded quickly and were able to fly their first combat mission on April 9, 1945.  VMF-322 remained on Okinawa for the rest of the war as they made bombing runs over the Japanese mainland.  Following the war, the squadron moved to Midway Island in November 1945 where they remained as part of Marine Aircraft Group 44 (MAG-44) until they were deactivated on November 30, 1949.

Cold War

VMF-322 was reactivated during the Korean War on July 6, 1951, again flying the F4U Corsair.  The squadron moved to Naval Air Station South Weymouth in January 1954 and transitioned to the F9F Cougar in March 1955.  The squadron was re-designated as Marine Attack Squadron 322 (VMA-322) in May 1958 and changed aircraft again, this time to the FJ3 Fury in November 1959.   In September 1962 the squadron received its final aircraft in the venerable A-4 Skyhawk.  In 1964,  VMA-322 absorbed the aircraft and personnel of VMA-217 after their deactivation.

VMA-322 was decommissioned on June 27, 1992, as part of the post-Cold War drawdown of the United States Military

See also

 United States Marine Corps Aviation
 List of active United States Marine Corps aircraft squadrons
 List of decommissioned United States Marine Corps aircraft squadrons

Notes

References
Bibliography

 

Web

 VMA-322 Fighting Gamecocks
 Naval Institute Proceedings – VMA-322
 History of the South Weymouth Naval Air Station

322
Military units and formations in Massachusetts
Inactive units of the United States Marine Corps